Hamidullah Haji Abdullah Wakily (Dari: حمیدالله وکیلی; born 1 January 1993) is an Afghan footballer who plays for De Maiwand Atalan and the Afghanistan national football team.

International career
Wakily made his senior international debut on 10 October 2017 in a 3-3 draw with Jordan in AFC Asian Cup qualification.

References

External links

Profile at EuroSport
Profile at ESPN FC
Profile at WhoScored

1993 births
Living people
Afghan Premier League players
Afghan footballers
Afghanistan international footballers
Association football goalkeepers
People from Farah Province